Yellow River State Forest, (YRSF),  is mostly forested land owned by the Iowa Department of Natural Resources. It is located in the southeastern corner of Allamakee County, the most northeasterly of Iowa's counties. It is adjacent to the Upper Mississippi River National Wildlife and Fish Refuge and is just north of Effigy Mounds National Monument in the bluff region of the Upper Mississippi River.

History 
The forest was established in 1933 by the Civilian Conservation Corps with the purchase of 1500 acres of land at the mouth of the Yellow River. It now has six units: Luster Heights, Paint Creek North, Paint Creek South, Paint Rock, Waukon Junction and Yellow River, collectively aggregating . The original  were transferred to the National Park Service in 1945, due to the presence of many Native American effigy mounds, and is now known as Effigy Mounds National Monument. The majority of YRSF is now in the catchment of Paint Creek. Some of the forest is reclaimed farmland, but much of it was never farmed because of the steepness of the terrain.

The State and the various Federal agencies actively cooperate in the management of the lands under their care, particularly in the use of fire to maintain goat prairies, which are found "on steep, thin soils with a south-southwest exposure. The best examples occur in northeast Iowa's Paleozoic Plateau, but similar prairie can be found in other parts of the state."

Geological history 
The forest is located in the Driftless Area of Iowa, a region that was not glaciated during the last ice age. The geology of the region shows ancient Silurian period formations. The Yellow River and Paint Creek have rugged, steep walled canyons, showing millennia of erosion, where glacial action would have otherwise smoothed out the features.

Lumber production 
Yellow River is home to one of only two public-owned sawmills in Iowa, with the other at Shimek State Forest. The first sawmill in Iowa, which was built in the 1800s, was also located in Yellow River. About 150,000 board feet (350 m³) of lumber is annually harvested in the forest and processed by inmates at the minimum-security Luster Heights Prison Farm. The prisoners do other work in the forest as well. The lumber produced at the sawmill is used for state-related projects and can be produced for private orders. The type of wood produced at the sawmill depends on the type of wood that grows in the forest (mainly oak and hickory).

Yellow River Fire Tower 
The forest includes the Yellow River Fire Tower, the only fire tower standing in Iowa. The tower is an Aermotor LS40 model fire tower
sold to the Iowa Department of Natural Resources from the U.S. Forest Service. It was acquired in 1950 and rebuilt on the current site in 1962. Today it is in poor condition, most of the window sashes have been broken out, all the window glass is gone, some of the cab roofing is gone, and the wood on the stairs and in the cab has rotted away, most of this is due to vandalism. So for that and safety reasons, the tower was fenced in and is currently closed to the public. It was listed on the National Register of Historic Places in 2021.

Tower measurements
 Tower height- 100 feet
 Cab- 7x7 feet
 Elevation- 1047 feet

References

Sources
 Iowa Department of Natural Resources - Yellow River
 Brochure, Iowa DNR (*.pdf)
 Iowa Audubon Society
 Cross-country skiing
 Paint Creek, Army Corps of Engineers
 Yellow River Fire Tower
 EPA return

Protected areas of Allamakee County, Iowa
Driftless Area
Iowa state forests
Protected areas on the Mississippi River
Protected areas established in 1933
Civilian Conservation Corps in Iowa
1933 establishments in Iowa